Honda Z100 was a prototype Honda Motor Company minibike which was introduced at the Tama Tech amusement Park in Tokyo, Japan in 1961. The Z100 minibike was never meant to be produced and sold to consumers. The success of the Z100 prototype convinced Honda to produce and sell the minibike to consumers.

Background 
The Tama Tech park opened in 1961 and was owned by the Honda Motor Company. The park attractions involved many different motorsports. Honda developed the Z100 minibike for the park, it was never meant to be a product for consumers.

Honda had built a new Suzuka Circuit so that park goers could experience the joys of driving. The minibike was meant to be ridden around the Tama Tech park. Honda took note of the fact that it became the park's most popular attraction.

History 
The minibike was not a production motorcycle, so the engine in the Z100 was repurposed from the Honda Super Cub. The 1961 Super Cub engine which was used in the Z100, was a 49 cc. The Z100 had small 5" wheels and the minibike had a white fuel tank and a bright red frame.

The bike was intentionally built small to accommodate children, but it also appealed to adults who rode them around the circuit. The bike soon came to be known as a monkey bike because most adult people, looked large in relation to the very small motorcycle. Onlookers described riders as looking like a Monkey on the bike.

Honda recognized the popularity of the minibike and they decided to manufacture a street-legal version of the bike. In 1963 they released the bike in the Japanese market and called it the CZ100. The Z100 proved to be so popular that it was introduced to the European market as the CZ100 in 1964.

Legacy 
The Z100 was a prototype so it is both rare and collectable. The minibike was the precursor to all of the other versions of minibikes produced by Honda. The prototype Honda Z100 proved the minibike concept could be successful as a niche product and it led many years of Honda Minibike production. The little bikes were all powered by the same 50cc engine with a 3 speed transmission. The Z series Honda Minibikes that followed had folding handlebars so that users could stow them in the trunk of their cars.

See also
 List of scooter manufacturers
 Minibike
 Pocketbike
 Pit bike

References

External links 
Video of the Honda Z100

Honda Z100
Motorcycles introduced in 1961
Minibikes
1961 introductions